Nahani (Nahane, Nahanni) is an Athapaskan word used to designate native groups located in British Columbia, the Northwest Territories and the Yukon Territory between the upper Liard River and the 64th parallel north latitude.  While these native groups do not necessarily have anything in common, the Canadian government used the term "Nahani" until the 1970s to refer to them collectively.  The group term applied to several distinct tribes:
 Kaska, located between the Dease River and the Beaver River, divided into two main regional groupings, and further divided into bands: 
Titshotina or Hés tʼat gudene - ″Among the Mountain People″ to the east, between the Cassiar Mountains and Liard and Dease Rivers, in British Columbia.
Tsezotine (″Big Water People″), to the west of the Titshotina / Hés tʼat gudene.
 Takutine, a Kaska band on Teslin River and Teslin Lake, and upper Taku River.
 Pelly River Indians: The Pelly and Ross River tribes were destroyed in 1884, likely by a band of Hare Indians. A band consisting of two survivors as well as members from surrounding tribes reformed in the same area under this name.
 Esbataottine (″Goat People″) (also: Espatodena, (E)spa’totena, Espa tah dena, located north and west of the Kaska along the Beaver River, South Nahanni River, and North Nahanni River.
 Etagottine (″Air People″), in the valleys of Gravel River and Dahachuni River.
 Tagish, about Tagish Lake and Marsh Lake.
 Tahltan were sometimes considered a Nahani tribe.

These groups are identified as Southern Tutchone and Kaska language speakers. In 1996, there were 2,407 registered Nahani in Canada.

See also
Nahanni River

References
 The Indians of Canada, Diamond Jenness, 1932.
 "Nahani". The Canadian Encyclopedia.
 The Indian Tribes of North America, John Reed Swanton, 1952.

.

First Nations in British Columbia
First Nations in Yukon
Indigenous peoples of the Subarctic
First Nations in the Northwest Territories